Mulheres Africanas – A Rede Invisível is a 2012 Brazilian documentary film written and directed by Carlos Nascimbeni.

Overview
The documentary presents an overview of the achievements and struggles of women in Africa in the last century. The film includes testimony from five women who tell their life stories: Graça Machel, human rights activist and wife of Nelson Mandela; Mama Sara Masari, businesswoman, Leymah Gbowee, winner of the Nobel Peace Prize; Luisa Diogo, former Prime Minister of Mozambique and Nadine Gordiner, winner of the Nobel Prize in Literature.

References

2010s Portuguese-language films
Brazilian documentary films
2013 documentary films
2013 films
Films shot in Africa
Documentary films about women in Africa
Documentary films about African politics
2010s English-language films
2013 multilingual films
Brazilian multilingual films